Heterorhea is an extinct genus of ratites in the rhea family. The type species is H. dabbenei. from the Late Pliocene Monte Hermoso Formation, Buenos Aires, Argentina. The holotype of the genus is missing.

References

Bibliography 
 

Ratites
Pliocene birds of South America
Chapadmalalan
Neogene Argentina
Fossils of Argentina
Fossil taxa described in 1914